Squankum (Lenape for "place of evil ghosts" or "place where evil spirits dwell") is an unincorporated community located within Howell Township in Monmouth County, New Jersey, United States. The name Squankum was used for a town in Gloucester County, which was changed to present day Williamstown (see note above), due to postal regulations that prohibited the two towns from having the same name.

Description
Located within Howell Township, Squankum is near Allaire State Park.  Major county roads in Squankum include 524 and 547. Interstate 195 provides access to Squankum, along with its neighboring town, Farmingdale, via exit 31B.

See also
Lower Squankum, New Jersey
List of place names of Native American origin in New Jersey

References

Neighborhoods in Howell Township, New Jersey
Unincorporated communities in Monmouth County, New Jersey
Unincorporated communities in New Jersey